Soyuz T-3 was a Soviet spaceflight, launched on 27 November 1980 to the Salyut 6 space station.  It was the first Soyuz spacecraft to carry three cosmonauts following the fatal Soyuz 11 disaster in 1971.

The mission was both an early flight of the new Soyuz-T variant craft, as well as one of the later flights to the Salyut 6 station, which had successfully received several crews and visiting craft in recent years.  Unlike previous habitations of the station, the crew of Soyuz T-3 did not receive any visitors, and thus did not exchange Soyuz craft with other crews for a return journey, a common practice.

Crew

Backup crew

Mission summary
Although the main objective of the crew's mission was to refurbish Salyut 6, part of their mission also involved testing their spacecraft. During their brief stay on Salyut 6, the crew performed experiments using the Splav and Kristall units, and studied biological material which had been carried aboard their Soyuz using the Svetoblok and Oazis units. Much of their time, however, was devoted to station maintenance.

On 2 December they began conducting the Mikroklimat experiment to assess the station's living conditions, and began work on the thermal control system. They installed a new hydraulic unit with four pumps. On 4 December, they replaced electronics in the station's telemetry system. 5 December saw them repairing electrical system faults. Other repairs included replacement of a program and timing device in the onboard control system and replacement of a power supply unit for the compressor in the refueling system. The Salyut 6 Principal Expedition 4 crew in TsUP provided the crew with advice as they made their repairs. On 8 December, Progress 11 carried out an orbital correction for the complex.

Upon leaving the station the craft's orbital module was left attached to Salyut 6 for a few hours, while its descent and service modules completed procedures for re-entry. This procedure was also used during the undocking of Soyuz T-4.

See also

List of human spaceflights to Salyut space stations
List of Salyut expeditions

References

Crewed Soyuz missions
1980 in the Soviet Union
Spacecraft launched in 1980
Spacecraft which reentered in 1980
Spacecraft launched by Soyuz-U rockets